Kľak is a village and municipality in the Žarnovica District, Banská Bystrica Region in Slovakia.

History
On January 21, 1945 the village was burned by Waffen-SS anti-partisan unit Edelweiss with help of Heimatschutz unit. There were 84 inhabitants of the village killed (including 36 children), and all of 132 houses and buildings were destroyed. Numerous victims were burned alive in their own houses. Nazi soldiers raided the village and expelled the rest of the inhabitants from the village, they also shot all of the cattle. Considering the method of accomplishment, not the number of casualties, this was one of the most brutal war crimes committed on the Slovak territory during World War II.

Genealogical resources

The records for genealogical research are available at the state archive "Statny Archiv in Banska Bystrica, Nitra, Slovakia"

 Roman Catholic church records (births/marriages/deaths): 1759-1920 (parish A)

See also
 List of municipalities and towns in Slovakia

External links
https://web.archive.org/web/20080111223415/http://www.statistics.sk/mosmis/eng/run.html
Surnames of living people in Klak

References 

Villages and municipalities in Žarnovica District